Ottokar I may refer to:

Ottokar I of Bohemia, king of Bohemia (1198–1230)
Ottokar I of Styria (?–1075)